Slatina is a municipality and village in Svitavy District in the Pardubice Region of the Czech Republic. It has about 200 inhabitants.

Administrative parts
The hamlet of Březinka is an administrative part of Slatina.

References

Villages in Svitavy District